Steeplechase is an sports video game by released in arcades 1975 by Atari, Inc. Developed by Atari subsidiary Kee Games, it simulates a steeplechase-style horse race. It was distributed in Japan by Nakamura Seisakusho (Namco) in 1976.

Gameplay
Up to six players can play against each other, each choosing a horse while the computer controls the seventh horse on the bottom. Each player's horse begins galloping, and the players must jump over obstacles in their lanes by pressing their colored buttons. The horse that successfully jumps all obstacles smoothly becomes the fastest horse and wins.

Development
The game was originally called AstroTurf, and all printed circuit boards still have the name on the board. The game is housed in a custom extra wide cabinet that six individually colored and lit buttons used to make a player's horse jump. The monitor is a 23" black and white CRT monitor with 6 color overlays to make each of the 6 horizontally stacked lanes match their colored button counterparts. Sounds include a bugle, galloping hoof beats, and crowd cheers.

Ports
A conversion for the Atari Video Computer System programmed by Jim Huether was released under the same name in 1980. It was developed at Atari and distributed under Sears' Tele-Games label. It is one of three games from Atari exclusively for the Tele-Games line.

Legacy
A European version was released by Löwen-Automaten. A Soviet clone of this machine with exact gameplay and graphics, but different cabinet was called Skachki, which can be literally translated as "horse race".

References

External links

Steeplechase (Atari 2600) at Atari Mania

1975 video games
Arcade video games
Atari 2600 games
Atari arcade games
Discrete video arcade games
Horse racing video games
Sports video games
Video games developed in the United States